The Roß- und Buchstein (1,701 m) is a mountain of the Tegernsee Mountains range, in the Bavarian Prealps, Bavaria, Germany. The Tegernsee cabin is lodged between the Roßstein and the Buchstein.

Mountains of Bavaria
One-thousanders of Germany
Mountains of the Alps